Intellectual virtues are qualities of mind and character that promote intellectual flourishing, critical thinking, and the pursuit of truth. They include: intellectual responsibility, perseverance, open-mindedness, empathy, integrity, intellectual courage, confidence in reason, love of truth, intellectual humility, imaginativeness, curiosity, fair-mindedness, and autonomy. So-called virtue responsibilists conceive of intellectual virtues primarily as acquired character traits, such as intellectual conscientiousness and love of knowledge. Virtue reliabilists, by contrast, think of intellectual virtues more in terms of well-functioning mental faculties such as perception, memory, and intuition. Intellectual virtues are studied extensively in both critical thinking and virtue epistemology.

Aristotle 
Aristotle analyzed virtues into  and  virtues. In the Posterior Analytics and Nicomachean Ethics he identified five intellectual virtues as the five ways the soul arrives at truth by affirmation or denial. These are then separated into three classes:
Theoretical
Sophia – wisdom (rational intuition and scientific knowledge directed toward the highest and most valuable objects)
Episteme – scientific knowledge of objects that are necessary and unchanging
Nous – rational intuition of first principles or self-evident truths
Practical
Phronesis – practical wisdom/prudence
Productive
Techne – craft knowledge, art, skill

Subjacent intellectual virtues in Aristotle:
Euboulia – deliberating well, deliberative excellence; thinking properly about the right end.
 Sunesis – understanding, sagacity, astuteness, consciousness of why something is as it is. For example, the understanding you have of why a situation is as it is, prior to having phronesis.
Gnomê – judgement and consideration; allowing us to make equitable or fair decisions.
Deinotes – cleverness; the ability to carry out actions so as to achieve a goal.

See also

Critical thinking
Epistemic virtue
Ethics of belief
Intellectual dishonesty
Intellectual responsibility
Paideia
Virtue ethics

References 
Aristotle, Nicomachean Ethics, Book VI.
Richard Paul Critical Thinking: What Every Person Needs to Survive in a Rapidly Changing World (Rev. 2nd ed.).  Santa Rosa, CA: Foundation for Critical Thinking, 1992.
Richard Paul and Linda Elder, Critical Thinking: Tools for Taking Charge of Your Learning and Your Life. Upper Saddle River, NJ: Prentice Hall, 2001.
Michael DePaul and Linda Zagzebski, eds. Intellectual Virtue. Oxford: Oxford University Press, 2003.
James Montmarquet, Epistemic Virtue and Doxastic Responsibility. Lanham, MD: Rowman and Littlefield, 1993.
Robert C. Roberts and W. Jay Wood, Intellectual Virtues: An Essay in Regulative Epistemology. New York: Oxford University Press, 2007.

External links 

Virtue Epistemology, Stanford Encyclopedia of Philosophy.
Glossary of Critical Thinking Terms: An Educator's Guide to Critical Thinking Terms and Concept
Philosophy of Aristotle
Virtue